Orewa College is a state coeducational combined intermediate and secondary school located in Orewa, on the Hibiscus Coast north of Auckland, New Zealand.
A total of  students from Years 7 to 13 (ages 10 to 18) attend the school as of

History
The school opened in 1956 as Orewa District High School with a roll of 101 students, a combined primary and secondary school. In 1974, the primary school was split off and the school became Orewa College. Originally Year 9 to 13 only, Year 7 and 8 were added in 2005.

2009 boiler explosion
On 24 June 2009, one of the school's coal-fired central heating boilers exploded while maintenance on the heating system was being carried out. The explosion blew the roof off the boiler house and shattered windows across the school. School caretaker Richard Nel received burns to 90 percent of his body and later died of his injuries in hospital. A contractor was also critically injured, receiving severe head injuries and burns to the abdomen and legs, but survived the accident.

The school's board of trustees was subsequently charged under the Health and Safety in Employment Act 1992. They pleaded guilty to all charges at the court-case in April 2010, and were subsequently ordered to pay reparation and court costs totalling nearly $137,000.

International Students 
International students make up for around 20% of the school roll.

Germany and Japan have ongoing exchange programmes with the college - students stay from 3 months to 3 years.

Other international students are immigrants to New Zealand and their high volume reflects that of the Northern Auckland population of high foreign immigrants, mostly from Asian countries.

Arts and Events Centre 
Orewa College, along with the Rodney District Council decided to build a flexible, multi-use, modern auditorium and is now a valuable asset to the students and teachers of the college and the community.

The OAEC offers several areas which can be booked for commercial or community events, and has 450sqm of flat floor space, and a seating capacity of up to 700. The Auditorium includes full audio visual facilities including 2 projectors & screens, sound system with microphone and standard lighting. Stage and special effect lighting is available when hiring school technicians. The Auditorium also includes efficient heat pump & air conditioning units.

Statistics

At the December 2016 Education Review Office (ERO) review of the school, Orewa College had 1847 students, including 63 international students. The school roll's gender composition was 52% male and 48% female, and its ethnic composition was 69% New Zealand European (Pākehā),  12% Māori, 4% Asian, 3% Pacific Islanders, and 2% Other.

References

External links 
Orewa College Website
Orewa Arts and Events Centre Website

Educational institutions established in 1956
Secondary schools in Auckland
Rodney Local Board Area
1956 establishments in New Zealand
Boiler explosions